Fiorello Henry LaGuardia (born Fiorello Raffaele Enrico LaGuardia, ; December 11, 1882September 20, 1947) was an American attorney and politician who represented New York in the House of Representatives and served as the 99th Mayor of New York City from 1934 to 1945. Known for his irascible, energetic, and charismatic personality and diminutive, rotund stature, La Guardia is acclaimed as one of the greatest mayors in American history. A liberal member of the Republican Party, La Guardia was frequently cross-endorsed by parties other than his own, especially parties on the left under New York's electoral fusion laws.

He was born to Italian immigrants in New York City. Before serving as mayor, La Guardia represented Manhattan in Congress and on the New York City Board of Aldermen. As mayor, during the Great Depression and World War II, La Guardia unified the city's transit system; expanded construction of public housing, playgrounds, parks, and airports; reorganized the New York Police Department; and implemented federal New Deal programs within the city. He pursued a long series of political reforms, curbing the power of the powerful Irish-controlled Tammany Hall political machine that controlled the Democratic  Party in Manhattan. He also re-established merit-based employment and promotion within city administration.

La Guardia was also a highly visible national political figure. His support for the New Deal and relationship with President Franklin D. Roosevelt crossed party lines, brought federal funds to New York City, and cut off patronage to La Guardia's Tammany enemies. La Guardia's WNYC radio program "Talk to the People", which aired from December 1941 until December 1945, expanded his public influence beyond the borders of the city.

Early life and education

Fiorello Raffaele Enrico La Guardia, with Enrico later being Americanized as Henry and removing Raffaele, was born in Greenwich Village, New York City, on December 11, 1882, to Achille Luigi Carlo La Guardia and Irene Luzzatto-Coen. He was named in honor of his maternal grandmother, paternal grandfather, and uncle. Achille was born in Foggia, Kingdom of the Two Sicilies, on March 26, 1849, and his father, Don Raffaele La Guardia, was a municipal official. Achille visited the United States in 1878, while on tour with Adelina Patti. Irene, a member of the Sephardic Jewish Luzzatto family, was born in Trieste, Austria, on July 18, 1859. They married on June 3, 1880, after having known each other for half a year. Achille, a former Catholic, was an atheist and Irene was a nonpracticing Jew. Achille prohibited his children from speaking Italian and Fiorello would not become proficient in Italian until his time as a consular agent.

Achille enlisted in the United States Army in 1885, and served in the 11th Infantry Regiment as a warrant officer and chief musician. His family lived in the Dakota Territory, New York, and the Arizona Territory during his time at Fort Sully, Madison Barracks, Fort Huachuca, and Whipple Barracks. Fiorello was enrolled in the Episcopal Church in Prescott, Arizona, and practiced that religion all his life. The onset of the Spanish–American War led to their transfer to St. Louis, Missouri, and then Achille was sent to Mobile, Alabama. Fiorello attempted to join the army, but was rejected. He was accepted as a war correspondent for the St. Louis Post-Dispatch. Achille and Fiorello did not reach Cuba because Achille contracted hepatitis and malaria after consuming embalmed beef. He was discharged from the military on account of his illness and given a pension of $8 per month. The La Guardia family moved to Trieste, and Achille died in Capodistria on October 21, 1904.

Career
Fiorello became a clerk at the US consulate in Budapest and worked there from 1901 to 1904. He then served as the agent in charge of the US consulate in Fiume from 1904 to 1906. He left Europe after failing to gain a promotion to consul-general in Fiume or an appointment as consul-general in Belgrade. He worked as an interpreter for the immigration services at Ellis Island from November 6, 1907 to 1910. He was a Croatian, Italian, and German interpreter and Felix Frankfurter, who met La Guardia during his time at Ellis Island, described him as "a gifted interpreter".

Upon returning to America he worked as a fireproof brick manufacturer in Portsmouth, Ohio. He returned to New York City and worked a series of odd jobs such as a translator for the New York Society for the Prevention of Cruelty to Children, a steamship company clerk, stenographer at Pratt Institute, and a clerk for Abercrombie & Fitch. In 1912, around 60,000 garment workers went on strike and La Guardia, who was friends with August Bellanca, gave speeches in Italian and Yiddish in support of the strike.

La Guardia graduated from the Dwight School, a private school on the Upper West Side of New York City. He graduated from the New York University School of Law and was admitted to the bar in 1910. He became a member of the Garibaldi Lodge of the Masonic Order in 1913. Frederick C. Tanner recommended La Guardia for a job working for the Attorney General of New York on September 15, 1911, and he served as the deputy attorney general from January 1, 1915 to 1917.

In 1925, La Guardia formed the La Guardia Publishing Company using his savings and a second mortgage to publish L'Americolo, an Italian-language magazine. He competed against Generoso Pope's Il Progresso Italo-Americano and Corriere d'America. The magazine failed with La Guardia losing $15,000 and his mortgage.

Early political career

Local politics
La Guardia joined the Republican club while attending NYU School of Law. He supported William Howard Taft during the 1912 presidential election and replaced William Chadbourne as district captain due to Chadbourne's support for Theodore Roosevelt's third party campaign. La Guardia refused to support John Purroy Mitchel's Fusion campaign during the 1913 mayoral election despite Mitchel's support among Republicans.

Republican political boss Samuel S. Koenig convinced La Guardia to run in the 1919 special election for President of the New York City Board of Aldermen created by Al Smith's resignation to become governor. La Guardia defeated William M. Bennett for the Republican nomination and Paul Windels worked as his campaign manager. During the campaign he was endorsed by The New York Times and Citizens Union. He defeated Democratic nominee Robert L. Moran. Moran suffered from a spoiler effect caused by Michael Kelly, a former Democrat, running as the Liberty Party candidate. La Guardia resigned from the United States House of Representatives on December 31, 1919.

La Guardia supported Republican presidential and gubernatorial candidates Warren G. Harding and Nathan L. Miller during the 1920 election. However, he later attacked Miller for his public transit policies and getting rid of welfare programs. His opposition to Miller ruined his chances in the 1921 mayoral election and the Republican nomination was given to Henry Curran. He attempted to defeat Curran in the primary, despite warnings from Koenig and Windels, and was defeated. La Guardia favored Smith, the Democratic nominee, during the 1928 presidential election.

U.S. House of Representatives

Elections

La Guardia ran for a seat in the U.S. House of Representatives from New York's 14th congressional district during the 1914 election. He chose to run as he noticed during a 25th Assembly district Republican club meeting that nobody was nominated for it as Frederick Marshall unexpectedly withdrew. The district was a strongly Democratic and Tammany Hall. He lost to Democratic nominee Michael F. Farley, whom he accused of being illiterate.

Clarence Fay, the Republican district leader in the 25th Assembly district, sought to have Hamilton Fish III nominated for the seat in the 1916 election. Tanner unsuccessfully attempted to convince La Guardia to not run. Fish withdrew before the primary and La Guardia won the Republican nomination. He appealed to the different ethnic groups in the district and was endorsed by New Yorker Staats-Zeitung which traditionally supported Democratic candidates. He defeated Farley by 357 votes.

Tammany Hall and the Democrats supported La Guardia in the 1918 election in order to prevent an anti-war Socialist victory. He defeated Socialist nominee Scott Nearing in the election.

La Guardia considered running in the 1922 gubernatorial election and published his ideas for the Republican state platform in the column in the New York Evening Journal given to him by William Randolph Hearst. Koenig was able to compromise with La Guardia to avoid a primary with Miller. He was given the Republican nomination for New York's 20th congressional district to succeed retiring Representative Isaac Siegel in the 1922 election. He defeated Democratic nominee Henry Frank and Socialist nominee William Karlin.

La Guardia attended the Conference for Progressive Political Action in 1922. Koenig told La Guardia that his renomination was dependent on him supporting the Republicans in the 1924 presidential election. La Guardia considered supporting the Democrats, but declined to do so after the nomination of John W. Davis. He gave his support to Robert M. La Follette and the Progressive Party. La Guardia announced his departure from the Republican Party on the front page of The New York Times. He and Gilbert Roe managed La Follette's presidential campaign in the eastern United States. La Guardia, running with the Socialist nomination, raised $3,764.25 and defeated Frank and Siegel in the election. La Guardia's partisan affiliation in Congress was labeled as Socialist and Victor L. Berger, the only other Socialist in Congress, described him as "my whip".

La Guardia returned to the Republican Party in the 1926 election and won by 55 votes against Democratic nominee H. Warren Hubbard and Socialist nominee George Dobsevage. He was the only Republican elected to the U.S. House from New York City. He defeated Democratic nominee Saul J. Dickheiser in the 1928 election. He defeated Democratic nominee Vincent H. Auleta in the 1930 election. 

La Guardia considered running as a Democrat in the 1932 election and his idea received support from William Green, John L. Lewis, and Robert F. Wagner. Political boss John H. McCooey supported him running as a Democrat, but Tammany Hall leader James Joseph Hines opposed him and had the nomination given to James J. Lanzetta. Lanzetta defeated La Guardia in the election due to the coattail effect of Franklin D. Roosevelt's victory in the presidential election. Robert M. La Follette Jr. stated that "the people have temporarily lost one of their most faithful servants".

La Guardia met Vito Marcantonio at Marcantonio's high school graduation in 1921. Marcantonio was a leader of La Guardia's supporters, Fiorello H. La Guardia Political Association (Ghibboni), during the 1924 election.

Tenure

La Guardia was interested in airplanes and served as a director and attorney for Giuseppe Mario Bellanca's company. He enlisted to fight in World War I and was promoted to captain by October 1917. He and Major General William Ord Ryan trained Italian pilots in Foggia. La Guardia became certified to fly on December 12, 1917. King Victor Emmanuel III of Italy gave him the Flying Cross.

He rose to the rank of major in command of a unit of Caproni Ca.44 bombers on the Italian-Austrian front.

While he was away at war his office was managed by Harry Andrews and Marie Fisher while constituent services were handled by Representative Isaac Siegel. A petition with over 3,000 signatures was given to Speaker Champ Clark on January 8, 1918, asking for La Guardia's seat to be vacated, but Clark refused to allow a motion to vacate La Guardia's seat.

During La Guardia's tenure in the U.S. House he served on the Judiciary committee. Oswald Garrison Villard, editor of The Nation, stated that he was "the most valuable member of Congress today". La Guardia supported impeaching Secretary of the Treasury Andrew Mellon on the grounds of him serving as a director of a private company, the Aluminum Company of America, while serving in the presidential cabinet.

La Guardia requested the pardon of Thomas Mooney. In 1931, James Smith, a black railroad porter, was put on trial for assault, but was unable to pay for a lawyer. La Guardia took the case pro bono after being requested by A. Philip Randolph and Smith was acquitted on September 26.

1929 mayoral election

La Guardia's supporters wanted him to run for mayor in the 1925 election, but he declined as he would be unlikely to defeat Jimmy Walker. He received the Republican nomination on August 1,1929.

In 1929, La Guardia ran for Mayor once again. This time, he received the Republican nomination, once again defeating William Bennett. However, he lost the general election to Walker in a landslide.

Mayor of New York

1933 mayoral election
Mayor Jimmy Walker and his Irish-run Tammany Hall were forced out of office by scandal and La Guardia was determined to replace him. La Guardia ran on the Fusion Party platform, which was supported by Republicans, reform-minded Democrats, and independents. La Guardia had enormous determination, high visibility, the support of reformer Samuel Seabury and a divisive primary contest. He also represented previously underrepresented communities, appealed to a wide range of cultural backgrounds with his lineage. He secured the nominations and expected an easy win against incumbent Mayor John P. O'Brien. However, Joseph V. McKee entered the race as the nominee of the new "Recovery Party" at the last minute. McKee was a formidable opponent, sponsored by Bronx Democratic boss Edward J. Flynn. La Guardia promised a more honest government, championing for greater efficiency and inclusiveness. La Guardia's win was based on a complex coalition of Republicans (mostly middle class German Americans in the boroughs outside Manhattan), a minority of reform-minded Democrats, Socialists, a large proportion of middle-class Jews, and the great majority of Italians, whose votes had previously been overwhelmingly loyal to Tammany.

During his mayoralty, La Guardia served as president of the United States Conference of Mayors from 1935 until 1945.

Agenda

La Guardia came to office in January 1934 with five main goals:
 Restore the financial health and break free from the bankers' control
 Expand the federally funded work-relief program for the unemployed
 End corruption in government and racketeering in key sectors of the economy
 Replace patronage with a merit-based civil service, with high prestige
 Modernize the infrastructure, especially transportation and parks

He achieved most of the first four goals in his first hundred days, as FDR gave him 20% of the entire national CWA budget for work relief. La Guardia then collaborated closely with Robert Moses, with support from the governor, Democrat Herbert Lehman, to upgrade the decaying infrastructure. The city was favored by the New Deal in terms of funding for public works projects. La Guardia's modernization efforts were publicized in the 1936 book New York Advancing: A Scientific Approach to Municipal Government, edited by Rebecca B. Rankin.

African-American politics
In 1935 a riot took place in Harlem. Termed the Harlem riot of 1935, it has been described as the first "modern" race riot, because it was committed primarily against property rather than persons. During the riots, La Guardia and Hubert Delany walked through the streets in an effort to calm the situation. After the riots, La Guardia convened the Mayor's Commission on Conditions of Harlem to determine the causes of the riot and a detailed report was prepared. The report identified "injustices of discrimination in employment, the aggressions of the police, and the racial segregation" as conditions which led to the outbreak of rioting. However, the Mayor shelved the committee's report, and did not make it public. The report would be unknown, except that a black New York newspaper, the Amsterdam News, subsequently published it in serial form.

Ethnic politics
La Guardia governed in an uneasy alliance with New York's Jews and liberal WASPs, together with ethnic Italians and Germans.

Not an orthodox Republican, he also ran as the nominee of the American Labor Party, a union-dominated anti-Tammany left wing group that supported Franklin D. Roosevelt for president beginning in 1936. La Guardia supported Roosevelt, chairing the Committee of Independent Voters for Roosevelt and his running mate, Henry A. Wallace, with Senator George Norris during the 1940 presidential election.

La Guardia was the city's first Italian-American mayor, but was not a typical Italian New Yorker. He was a Republican Episcopalian who had grown up in Arizona and had a Triestine Jewish mother and a lapsed Catholic father. He spoke several languages; when working at Ellis Island, he was certified as an interpreter for Italian, German, Yiddish, and Croatian. It served him well during a contentious congressional campaign in 1922. When Henry Frank, a Jewish opponent, accused him of anti-Semitism, La Guardia rejected the suggestion that he publicly disclose that his mother was Jewish as "self-serving". Instead, La Guardia dictated an open letter in Yiddish that was also printed in Yiddish. In it, he challenged Frank to publicly and openly debate the issues of the campaign entirely in the Yiddish language. Frank, although he was Jewish, could not speak the language and was forced to decline—and lost the election.

La Guardia's 1933 campaign coincided with the rise of racial and religious hostilities in Germany, and he supported a more anti-Nazi response while in office. He publicly supported groups that engaged in boycotts of German goods and spoke alongside Rabbi Stephen S. Wise, leader of the American Jewish Congress. In 1935, La Guardia caused an international stir when he denied a masseur license to a German immigrant, stating that Germany had violated a treaty guaranteeing equal treatment of American professionals by discriminating against American Jews. Despite threats from Germany (including a bomb threat against New York City's German Consulate), La Guardia continued to use his position as mayor to denounce Nazism. During his reelection campaign in 1937, speaking before the Women's Division of the American Jewish Congress, he called for the creation of a special pavilion at the upcoming New York World's Fair, "a chamber of horrors" for "that brown-shirted fanatic," referring to Hitler. He also led anti-Nazi rallies and promoted legislation to facilitate the U.S. rescue of the Jewish refugees. He also appointed more racially and religiously diverse judges to various New York courts, which was one of his most powerful weapons against Nazi prejudice. These appointments included Rosalie Loew Whitney, Herbert O'Brien, Jane Bolin, and Hubert Thomas Delany. La Guardia would soon regret appointing the Catholic O'Brien, who engaged in reactionary politics on the bench including decrying support for the Allied forces against the Axis in 1941, leading to La Guardia's condemnation of him with the famous line, “Senator, I have made a lot of good appointments and I think I am good ... but when I make a mistake, it’s a beaut.”

Crime
La Guardia criticized the gangsters who brought a negative stereotype and shame to the Italian community. His first action as mayor was to order the chief of police to arrest mob boss Lucky Luciano on whatever charges could be found. La Guardia then went after the gangsters with a vengeance, stating in a radio address to the people of New York in his distinct voice, "Let's drive the bums out of town." In 1934 he went on a search-and-destroy mission looking for mob boss Frank Costello's slot machines, rounding up thousands of the "one armed bandits," swinging a sledgehammer and dumping them off a barge into the water for the newspapers and media. In 1935 La Guardia appeared at the Bronx Terminal Market to institute a citywide ban on the sale, display, and possession of artichokes, whose prices were inflated by mobsters. When prices went down, the ban was lifted. In 1936, La Guardia had special prosecutor Thomas E. Dewey, a future Republican presidential candidate, single out Lucky Luciano for prosecution. Dewey led a successful investigation into Luciano's lucrative prostitution operation, eventually sending Luciano to jail with a 30–50 year sentence. The case was made into the 1937 movie Marked Woman, starring Bette Davis.

La Guardia proved successful in shutting down the burlesque theaters, whose shows offended his sensibilities.

Public works
La Guardia's admirers credit him, among other things, with restoring the economy of New York City during and after the Great Depression. He is given credit for many massive public works programs administered by his powerful Parks Commissioner Robert Moses, which employed thousands of voters. The mayor's relentless lobbying for federal funds allowed New York to develop its economic infrastructure.

To obtain large-scale federal money the mayor became a close ally of Roosevelt and New Deal agencies such as the CWA, PWA, and WPA, which poured $1.1 billion into the city from 1934 to 1939. In turn he gave FDR a showcase for New Deal achievement, helped defeat FDR's political enemies in Tammany Hall (the Democratic party machine in Manhattan). He and Moses built highways, bridges and tunnels, transforming the physical landscape of New York City. The West Side Highway, East River Drive, Brooklyn Battery Tunnel, Triborough Bridge, and two airports (LaGuardia Airport, and, later, Idlewild, now JFK Airport) were built during his mayoralty.

In 1943, La Guardia saved the Mecca Temple on 55th Street from demolition. Together with New York City Council President Newbold Morris, La Guardia converted the building to the New York City Center of Music and Dance. On December 11, 1943, City Center opened its doors with a concert from the New York Philharmonic—La Guardia even conducted a rendition of "The Star Spangled Banner."

1939
1939 was a busy year, as he opened the 1939 New York World's Fair at Flushing Meadows–Corona Park, Queens, opened New York Municipal Airport No. 2 in Queens (later renamed Fiorello H. La Guardia Field), and had the city buy out the Interborough Rapid Transit Company and the Brooklyn–Manhattan Transit Corporation, thus completing the public takeover of the New York City Subway system. The U.S. arrival of Georg and Maria Von Trapp and their children from Austria that fall at Ellis Island who would eventually become the Trapp Family Singers was another significant decade-ending event that year in La Guardia's mayoralty.

Reform
Responding to popular disdain for the sometimes corrupt City Council, La Guardia successfully proposed a reformed 1938 City Charter that created a powerful new New York City Board of Estimate, similar to a corporate board of directors.

La Guardia was also a supporter of the Ives-Quinn Act, "a law that would ban discrimination in employment on the bases of 'race, creed, color or national origin' and task a new agency, the New York State Commission Against Discrimination (SCAD), with education and enforcement." The bill passed in 1945, making New York the first state in the country to create an agency tasked with handling employment discrimination complaints.

World War II
In 1941 during the run-up to American involvement in World War II, President Roosevelt appointed La Guardia first director of the new Office of Civilian Defense (OCD). Roosevelt was an admirer of La Guardia; after meeting Winston Churchill for the first time he described him as "an English Mayor La Guardia". The OCD was the national agency responsible for preparing for blackouts, air raid wardens, sirens, and shelters in case of German air raids. The goal was to psychologically mobilize many thousands of middle class volunteers to make them feel part of the war effort. At the urging of aviation advocate Gill Robb Wilson, La Guardia, in his capacity as Director of the OCD, created the Civil Air Patrol with Administrative Order 9, signed by him on December 1, 1941, and published December 8, 1941. La Guardia remained Mayor of New York, shuttling back and forth with three days in Washington and four in the city in an effort to do justice to two herculean jobs. La Guardia focused on setting up air raid systems and training volunteer wardens. However, Roosevelt appointed his wife Eleanor Roosevelt as his assistant. She issued calls for actors to lead a volunteer talent program, and dancers to start a physical fitness program. That led to widespread ridicule and the president replaced both of them in December 1941 with a full-time director James M. Landis.

The war ended the Great Depression in the city. Unemployment ended, and the city was a gateway for military supplies and soldiers sent to Europe, with the Brooklyn Navy Yard providing many of the warships and the garment trade providing uniforms. The city's great financiers, however, were less important in decision making than the policy makers in Washington, and very high wartime taxes were not offset by heavy war spending. New York was not a center of heavy industry and did not see a wartime boom, as defense plants were built elsewhere.

FDR refused to make La Guardia a general and was unable to provide fresh money for the city. By 1944 the city was short of funds to pay for La Guardia's new programs. La Guardia was frustrated and his popularity slipped away and he ran so poorly in straw polls in 1945 that he did not run for a fourth term.

In July 1945, when the city's newspapers were closed by a strike, La Guardia famously read the comics on the radio.

Political positions
La Guardia opposed the Espionage Act of 1917 and stated that "if you pass this bill and if it is enacted into law you change all that our flag ever stood for and stands for". He supported the League of Women Voters in the 1920s. He voted in favor of the Child Labor Amendment. He proposed legislation to create a holiday in honor of Christopher Columbus.

As a congressman, La Guardia was a tireless and vocal champion of progressive causes, including relaxed restriction on immigration, removal of U.S. troops from Nicaragua to speaking up for the rights and livelihoods of striking miners, impoverished farmers, oppressed minorities, and struggling families. He supported progressive income taxes, greater government oversight of Wall Street, and national employment insurance for workers idled by the Great Depression. He supported allowing the direct election of the Governor of Puerto Rico.

In domestic policies he tended toward socialism and wanted to nationalize and regulate; however he was never close to the Socialist Party and never bothered to read Karl Marx.

When Mussolini's Fascist Italy invaded Ethiopia on October 3, 1935, a Black protest of Italian vendors at the King Julius General Market on Lenox and 118th Street turned into a riot and 1,200 extra NYC policemen were deployed on "war duty" to quell the riot. In December 1935, at an Italian-American rally, attended by 20,000, in Madison Square Garden, La Guardia presented a $100,000 check to the Italian Consul General, part of a total $700,000 raised from Italian-Americans to help fund the invasion.

Economics
La Guardia sponsored labor legislation and railed against immigration quotas. His major legislation was the Norris–La Guardia Act, cosponsored with Nebraska senator George Norris in 1932. It circumvented Supreme Court limitations on the activities of labor unions, especially as those limitations were imposed between the enactment of the Clayton Antitrust Act in 1914 and the end of the 1920s. Based on the theory that the lower courts are creations not of the Constitution but of Congress, and that Congress therefore has wide power in defining and restricting their jurisdiction, the act forbids issuance of injunctions to sustain anti-union contracts of employment, to prevent ceasing or refusing to perform any work or remain in any relation of employment, or to restrain acts generally constituting component parts of strikes, boycotts, and picketing. It also said courts could no longer enforce yellow-dog contracts, which are labor contracts prohibiting a worker from joining a union.

La Guardia opposed an attempt to raise the sales tax during the Great Depression and instead supported taxes on luxury items and a graduated income tax for people earning more than $100,000.

Foreign policy
La Guardia supported the League of Nations. He called for Fiume to be given to Italy despite it being promised to Yugoslavia by the Treaty of London. He supported the Russian Revolution, but criticized Ambassador David R. Francis for supporting Alexander Kerensky rather than Lavr Kornilov.

Never an isolationist, he supported using American influence abroad on behalf of democracy or for national independence or against autocracy. Thus he supported the Irish independence movement and the anti-czarist Russian Revolution of 1917, but did not approve of Vladimir Lenin. By 1946 he was praising Moscow. Unlike most progressive colleagues who were isolationist, La Guardia consistently backed internationalism, speaking in favor of the League of Nations and the Inter-Parliamentary Union as well as peace and disarmament conferences.

In 1946 President Harry Truman sent the ex-mayor as an envoy to Brazil, but diplomacy was not his forte. Truman then gave him as major job as head of the United Nations Relief and Rehabilitation Administration (UNRRA), with responsibility for helping millions of desperate refugees in Europe. La Guardia was exhausted and after seeing the horrors of war in Europe called for a massive aid program. Critics ridiculed that as worldwide WPA and the biggest boondoggle ever. He sided with Henry A. Wallace in calling for friendship with the Soviet Union, and attacked the new breed of Cold Warriors. He provided UNRRA funds to the Soviets despite warnings that the Kremlin used the money to rebuild its army. UNRRA shut down at the end of 1946. Despite his declining health La Guardia attacked the emerging "Truman Doctrine" that promised American financial help to stop the spread of Communism.

Prohibition
La Guardia opposed prohibition. He was one of the first Republicans in Congress to voice their opinions against prohibition. He testified to that effect before the first session of Congress in 1926.

On June 19, 1926, La Guardia mixed near beer and malt extract, which were legal, to create 2% beer in order to protest prohibition. He was immune from prosecution as a member of Congress.

Personal life

La Guardia met Thea Almerigotti, an immigrant from Trieste, while marching in an union picket line in 1913. They married on March 8, 1919, at a Catholic ceremony in St. Patrick's Cathedral. Their daughter, Fioretta Thea La Guardia, was born in June 1920, but died on May 8, 1921, and Thea died on November 29. The death of his wife was described as "the greatest tragedy of La Guardia's life" by M.R. Werner, who aided La Guardia when he wrote his autobiography.

Fisher volunteered for La Guardia's 1916 congressional campaign and became his secretary after his election. They were married by Ole J. Kvale, a Lutheran minister as Fisher was Lutheran, on February 28, 1929.

They adopted two children:
 Eric Henry (born 1930), a Hobart College graduate who became a professor at the University of Washington,
 Jean Marie (1928–1962), La Guardia's niece from his first marriage, the biological daughter of Thea's sister, a Barnard College graduate who later became an editor of Mademoiselle.

Nazi detention of sister and brother-in-law 
La Guardia's sister, the writer Gemma La Guardia Gluck and brother-in-law, Herman Gluck were living in Hungary and were arrested by the Gestapo on June 7, 1944, when the Nazis took control of Budapest. Adolf Eichmann and Heinrich Himmler knew that Gemma was La Guardia's sister and ordered her to be held as a political prisoner. She and Herman were deported to Mauthausen concentration camp in Austria. Gemma did not learn until her release that Herman had died at Mauthausen.
Gemma was transferred from Mauthausen to the notorious women's concentration camp at Ravensbrück, fifty miles from Berlin, where—unbeknownst to Gemma at the time—her daughter Yolanda (whose husband also died in the camps) and baby grandson were also held for a year in a separate barracks. Gemma Gluck, who was held in Block II of the camp and assigned prisoner #44139, was one of the few survivors of Ravensbrück and wrote about her time there.

The Germans abandoned Gluck, her daughter, and her grandson for a possible hostage exchange in April 1945 as the Russians advanced on Berlin. After the liberation of the camps, Gemma later wrote, the Soviets were "violating girls and women of all ages," and the three struggled as displaced persons in postwar Berlin, because they did not speak German and had no identity papers, money, or means of documenting where they had been.

Gemma finally managed to get word to the Americans, who contacted Fiorello, who was then director of the United Nations Relief and Rehabilitation Administration (UNRRA) and had been unable to locate his sister and brother-in-law since their disappearance. He worked to get them on the immigration lists, but asserted in a letter, included in the appendix of Gemma's memoir, that her "case was the same as that of hundreds of thousands of displaced people" and "no exceptions can be made." It took two years for her to be cleared and sent to the United States. She returned to New York in May 1947, where she was reunited with her brother only four months before his death. As he had made no provision for her, she lived the remainder of her life in very reduced circumstances in a public housing project in Queens until her death in 1962.

Gluck is one of the few American-born women interned by the Nazis, along with Virginia d'Albert-Lake.

Death and legacy

He died of pancreatic cancer in his home at 5020 Goodridge Avenue, in the Fieldston neighbourhood of Riverdale, Bronx, on September 20, 1947, aged 64. La Guardia is interred at Woodlawn Cemetery in the Bronx.

Legacy
A 1993 survey of historians, political scientists and urban experts conducted by Melvin G. Holli of the University of Illinois at Chicago saw La Guardia ranked as the best American big-city mayor to serve between the years 1820 and 1993. 

According to biographer Mason B. Williams, his close collaboration with Roosevelt's New Deal proved a striking success in linking national money and local needs. La Guardia enabled the political recognition of new groups that had been largely excluded from the political system, such as Jews and Italians. His administration (in cooperation with Robert Moses) gave New York its modern infrastructure. His far-sighted goals raised ambitions for new levels of urban possibility. According to Thomas Kessner, trends since his tenure mean that "people would be afraid of allowing anybody to take that kind of power".

Namesakes

New York's LaGuardia Airport, LaGuardia Community College, LaGuardia Place, and various parks and buildings around New York City are named for him.

Known for his love of music, La Guardia was noted for spontaneously conducting professional and student orchestras and was instrumental in the creation of the High School of Music & Art in 1936, now renamed the Fiorello H. La Guardia High School of Music & Art and Performing Arts.

In 1972, the United States Postal Service honored La Guardia with a 14-cent postage stamp.

A strong supporter of Zionism, LaGuardia Street and LaGuardia interchange, both in Tel Aviv, Israel, were named in his honor.

A street in Rijeka, Croatia, is named after Fiorello La Guardia. La Guardia worked in Rijeka as a U.S. Consular Agent from 1903 to 1906, when the city was known as Fiume and was under Hungarian administration. It was during this time that Rijeka's port played a vital role in connecting the Austro-Hungarian Empire to the United States, featuring direct passenger service between Rijeka and New York.

In popular culture
 La Guardia was the subject of the hit 1959 Broadway musical Fiorello! The original production of Fiorello! ran for two years and won 3 Tony Awards, including Best Musical and for Tom Bosley's portrayal of La Guardia, as well as a Pulitzer Prize for Drama in 1960.
 La Guardia was portrayed by Phil Arnold in The Court Martial of Billy Mitchell.
 Actor Tony Lo Bianco has portrayed La Guardia in several one-man plays, beginning with Hizzoner! in 1984. It debuted on Broadway in 1989, and Lo Bianco has since portrayed La Guardia in several off-Broadway versions, including LaGuardia (2008) and The Little Flower (2012–15).
 In Ghostbusters II, La Guardia's ghost talks to New York Mayor Lenny Clotch (David Margulies).
 In the alternate history drama The Plot Against America (2020), La Guardia is part of the opposition against the fascists in America.
 In the 2021 film In the Heights, Abuela Claudia refers to dancing with La Guardia during the song "Paciencia Y Fe" which recounts her early life.
 The Off-Broadway show Tammany Hall depicts La Guardia's 1929 mayoral run against Jimmy Walker.

See also
 Statue of Fiorello H. La Guardia, Manhattan
 La Guardia and Wagner Archives
 La Guardia Commission, a study on marijuana in U.S. society
 List of mayors of New York City
 New York City mayoral elections for votes in 1929, 1933, 1937 and 1941.
 Timeline of New York City, 1930s–1940s
 Mayor LaGuardia "Talk to the people" series on WNYC
 Fiorello LaGuardia (The Compassion of New York’s Famous Mayor)

Publications
 La Guardia, Fiorello H. (1948). The Making of an Insurgent: An Autobiography. Philadelphia: J.B. Lippincott.

Notes

References

Works cited
 
 
 
 
 
 . online

Further reading
 Brodsky, Alyn. (2003). The Great Mayor: Fiorello La Guardia and the Making of the City of New York. New York: Truman Talley Books.
 Capeci, Dominic J. “From Different Liberal Perspectives: Fiorello H. La Guardia, Adam Clayton Powell, Jr., and Civil Rights in New York City, 1941-1943.” Journal of Negro History 62#2 1977, pp. 160–73. online and in JSTOR
 
 Elliott, Lawrence. (1983). Little Flower: The Life and Times of Fiorello La Guardia. New York: William Morrow. . online
 Garrett, Charles. (1961). The La Guardia Years: Machine and Reform Politics in New York City. New Brunswick, NJ: Rutgers University Press.
 Goldstein, Richard. Helluva Town: The Story of New York City During World War II (2010) Online review
 
 Heckscher II, August. (1978). When La Guardia Was Mayor: New York's Legendary Years. New York: W.W. Norton. .
 Jeffers, H. Paul. (2002). The Napoleon of New York: Mayor Fiorello La Guardia. New York: John Wiley & Sons. . online.
 Kaufman, Herbert. "Fiorello H. La Guardia, Political Maverick" Political Science Quarterly 1990 105(1): 113–122.  in Jstor
 Mann, Arthur H. (1959). La Guardia: A Fighter Against His Times 1882–1933. Philadelphia: J.B. Lippincott; scholarly biography. online
La Guardia comes to power: 1933 (1965) online

External links

 Obituary, New York Times, September 21, 1947 La Guardia Is Dead; City Pays Homage To 3-Time Mayor
 La Guardia and Wagner Archives/Fiorello H. La Guardia Collection 
 oral interviews from the La Guardia and Wagner Archives/Fiorello H. La Guardia Oral History database
 Tiziano Thomas Dossena, "Fiorello La Guardia" in Bridge Apulia USA, No.3 (Italy, 1998) 
 1919 passport photo of Fiorello La Guardia
  WNYC Archives blogs featuring Mayor La Guardia
 Fiorello LaGuardia (The Compassion of New York’s Famous Mayor)

1882 births
1947 deaths
20th-century American lawyers
20th-century American politicians
American Episcopalians
American Labor Party members of the United States House of Representatives
American people in the Venona papers
American people of Italian-Jewish descent
American people of Italian descent
American social democrats
Burials at Woodlawn Cemetery (Bronx, New York)
Deaths from cancer in New York (state)
Deaths from pancreatic cancer
Lawyers from New York City
Mayors of New York City
Military personnel from New York City
New York University School of Law alumni
Peabody Award winners
People from East Harlem
People from Greenwich Village
People from Riverdale, Bronx
Politicians from Prescott, Arizona
Presidents of the United States Conference of Mayors
Republican Party members of the United States House of Representatives from New York (state)
Left-wing populism in the United States
Progressivism in the United States
United States Army officers
United States Army personnel of World War I